Cooperage is either the craft of barrel-making or the workshop in which the craft is practiced.

Cooperage may also refer to:
 Cooperage (film), a 1976 Canadian film
 Cooperage Ground, a football ground in Mumbai